The Wheels on the Bus is a video series by Our Happy Child Productions, LLC, of Simi Valley, California. The Wheels on the Bus series is a collection of educational DVDs, TV series, music CDs and downloadable videos that aim to teach early skills to young children.

History
Our Happy Child Productions was founded by Timothy Armstrong, an independent film producer.  He created the first DVD in the series, Mango and Papaya’s Animal Adventure and has written, directed and produced The Wheels on the Bus series.  The music is composed by Laura Hall. The series stars rock singer Roger Daltrey as Argon the Dragon, and Janie Laurel Escalle as Coco.

Series
Videos in the series include:

The Wheels on the Bus Video: Mango and Papaya's Animal Adventures (2003) 
The Wheels on the Bus Video: Mango Helps the Moon Mouse (2005)
Wheels on the Bus: Mango's Big Dog Parade (2007)

References

2000s educational films
Children's music albums
American educational films